Running with Scissors (RWS) is an American video game developer based in Tucson, Arizona. It was founded in 1996 by Vince Desi through a business decision of Riedel Software Productions, a maker of child-friendly games. RWS created and maintains the Postal franchise, which has often caused controversy for its use of violence. RWS' first game was Postal in 1997, which caused much controversy and a trademark lawsuit from the United States Postal Service that lasted until 2003. A potential second game, Flesh and Wire, was canceled in 1999. The company followed up Postal with Postal 2 in 2003. The third game in the series, Postal III, was co-developed by RWS and an internal team of publisher Akella, and RWS distanced itself from the game due to poor critical reception. RWS most recently worked on Postal 4: No Regerts, which was released in 2022, and the spin-off Postal: Brain Damaged.

History

Origins 

Running with Scissors (RWS) was founded by Vincent James Desiderio Jr., a native of Brooklyn with Italian roots. Early in his life, he picked up a high-school teaching career before quitting a semester later and working several different jobs, including taxi driver and manager of a recording studio. While a recruiter on Wall Street, he adopted the short name "Vince Desi" upon request from his boss. Eventually, while seeking to hire workers in the computer industry, Desi became involved with and later a consultant for the video game company Atari. He befriended one of his hires, recent Rochester Institute of Technology dropout Mike Riedel, with whom he founded Riedel Software Productions (RSP) after Atari faced financial instability. RSP specialized in developing edutainment games for children and games based on licensed properties on a work-for-hire basis, with its early games including Spy vs. Spy (its first game, developed for the magazine Mad in 1985), Tom & Jerry, and Bobby's World, as well as other games developed for Sesame Street, Hanna-Barbera, The Walt Disney Company, Warner Bros., and the World Wrestling Federation, among others. Because Desi had no knowledge of programming and little interest in video games, he handled business affairs for the company, while Riedel was in charge of creative operations.

By the early 1990s, when Desi was 39, several factors led him to wish to relocate; Desi and Riedel discussed several potential cities—including Phoenix, Santa Fe, Albuquerque, and Seattle—before they settled on Tucson, Arizona. Desi, Riedel and RSP moved to Tucson in 1991. At the time, RSP consisted of the two founders and two further employees, however, one of the employees did not turn up at John F. Kennedy International Airport, where the team was supposed to meet for the relocation, while the other employee quit two weeks following the relocation and moved back to New York. RSP was welcomed to the city by officials and the Greater Tucson Economic Council. The company was among the list of companies (others including Hughes Electronics) honored for moving to the city in 1992. In Tucson, RSP continued its prior business of developing child-friendly games and licensed games, though by 1996–1997, Desi and much of RSP's team were bored of developing them, wherefore RSP set up RWS as a separate company to develop games targeted at adults. This formation was announced on March 13, 1997. Initially, RWS was to be run alongside RSP, drawing funding from RSP's sales and acting as RSP's edgier label. Shared between the two companies were three development teams: One, consisting of seven people, developed the first RWS game, one creating an edutainment game based on the film Free Willy, and another making an edutainment game for an academic publisher.

Postal 
According to Desi, the RWS team wanted to make an original game, the most outrageous game they could. Inspired by the game Robotron: 2084, which had been playable at the RSP offices, RWS began work on Postal. The game saw the Postal Dude engage in mass murder, and it was named after the slang term "going postal", referring to murders performed by United States Postal Service (USPS) employees. In 1997, RWS filed a trademark for the word "Postal" in the area of electronic gaming. In response, the USPS counter-filed that trademark, alleging that it was moving into video games, and Marvin Travis Runyon, the United States Postmaster General at the time, sent RWS a letter condemning the game's theme. The legal battle was eventually dismissed with prejudice in June 2003. The theme also caused wider controversy within the media and the video game industry, to the surprise of Desi, who considered Postal to be more comical and "over-the-top" and stated that the game was not to be taken seriously. Postal was released in 1997 for Windows and Mac OS as the first game of Ripcord Games, a publishing label of Matsushita Electric's Panasonic Interactive Media division. Following the release, the game was targeted by senator Joe Lieberman, who labeled it as one of the worst things in America, while retail chains CompUSA and Wal-Mart refused to sell the game. In its first week, Postal was sold over 10,000 times in the United States, and sales in Europe (where the game was released by Take-Two Interactive) were expected to reach 100,000. RWS followed up with Special Delivery, an add-on of four levels released in August 1998 that allowed the player to murder lawyers, homeless people, and American Red Cross workers, among others. A Japan-exclusive version of Postal, titled Super Postal, was released in 2000, and Postal Plus, a bundle composed of Postal and Special Delivery, came out in 2002.

Postal 2 and other projects 
With Postal released, RWS conceived Flesh and Wire, an original three-dimensional sci-fi-themed game in which the player controls a blob-shaped character;  Desi described the game as unintentionally funny. However, the game was canceled by Ripcord in 1999 alongside two unannounced games, and RWS turned to focus only on Postal. Consequently, RWS soon picked up development on Postal 2, a sequel to Postal. The company attempted to make its humor more evident than it was in the original game so it would reach a wider audience. When brainstorming ideas for the game, the team considered Gary Coleman, a former child actor known for his role in the show Diff'rent Strokes, as a good fit for the game's theme. Desi called up Coleman, who agreed to his inclusion and performed himself in the game. Postal 2 was released in April 2003 through publisher Whiptail Interactive. Postal 2 was shortly banned in 13 countries; New Zealand banned it in 2004 and Australia in 2005. Desi later struck a deal with the company Softwrap to have the game distributed online, which bypassed the bans. Due to the popularity of Postal 2, Whiptail released Postal: Classic and Uncut, containing the original Postal and Special Delivery, as well as a demo version of Postal 2, in August that year. This was followed by Share the Pain, a version of Postal 2 that introduced online multiplayer to the game. In Europe, this version was published by Greek company Hell-Tech. A separate expansion, Apocalypse Weekend, was released in 2005. The Postal Fudge Pack—a compilation containing the original Postal, Share the Pain, Apocalypse Weekend, the fan-made total conversion Eternal Damnation, and the fan-made mod A Week in Paradise—was released in November 2006. A similar compilation, Postal: 10th Anniversary Collector's Edition, was released the following year.

During Postal 2 development, RWS got in contact with Uwe Boll, a director of video game-based films like House of the Dead, Alone in the Dark, and BloodRayne. Although Boll's films were usually received poorly, Desi believed that Boll's independent and anti-establishment attitude was a good fit for the Postal series. The resulting film was shot in the Vancouver area, with Desi playing himself as well as Krotchy, an anthropomorphic scrotum from the Postal universe. The film faced several issues, such as overlength and poor editing and marketing efforts.

Postal III, Postal Redux, and Postal 4 
RWS' next game was Postal III; the company struck a deal with Russian publisher Akella that saw RWS create the script, music, design and character development for the game, which was then moved to Akella's in-house developers, Trashmasters, for programming and art production. During the development, however, the Russian economy fell and the development was mostly ramped down. Postal III was released in December 2011 to very bad reception, leading RWS to pull it from its online store the following year. Desi stated that the finished Postal III was "a product that should have never been published". In response, RWS developed Paradise Lost, a new add-on for Postal 2 that was released in April 2015, twelve years after Postal 2 original release. In May 2016, the company released a remake of the original Postal titled Postal Redux. Another compilation, Postal XX: 20th Anniversary Edition, was released in 2017. RWS then released Postal 4: No Regerts, first as an early access game in October 2019 and then fully in April 2022. The company worked with developers Hyperstrange and CreativeForge Games on the spin-off Postal: Brain Damaged.

Games developed

Canceled 
 Flesh and Wire and two unannounced games – canceled in 1999

References

External links 
 

1996 establishments in Arizona
Companies based in Tucson, Arizona
Postal (franchise)
Privately held companies based in Arizona
Video game companies established in 1996
Video game companies of the United States
Video game development companies